Agriarctos nikolovi is an extinct species of panda from the Late Miocene of Bulgaria, some 6 million years ago. The epithet of scientific name commemorate Dr. Ivan Nikolov for his contribution to paleobiology studies of Bulgaria.

References

Miocene bears